Louis Aniweta Ifeanychukwu (born 10 July 1984 in Onitsha, Anambra State, Nigeria) is a Nigerian born-Rwandan footballer who last played for ENAD Polis Chrysochous  in Cypriot Second Division.

Career
His previous team were Alki Larnaca and Doxa Katokopias. From 2005-2006 he played for KS Skënderbeu Korçë in the Albanian Superliga. Before that he played for Mohammedan AC.

References

External links

1984 births
Living people
Sportspeople from Onitsha
Rwandan footballers
Rwanda international footballers
Rwandan expatriate footballers
Nigerian emigrants to Rwanda
Doxa Katokopias FC players
Association football midfielders
Alki Larnaca FC players
Association football utility players
Nea Salamis Famagusta FC players
APOP Kinyras FC players
APEP FC players
Ayia Napa FC players
Pafos FC players
Cypriot First Division players
Cypriot Second Division players
Expatriate footballers in India
Association football defenders
Expatriate footballers in Albania
Nigerian footballers
Expatriate footballers in Cyprus
KF Skënderbeu Korçë players
Nigerian expatriate sportspeople in India
Sporting Clube de Goa players
Association football forwards
East Bengal Club players
Nigerian expatriates in Albania
Jasper United F.C. players